Miss Universe 1985, the 34th Miss Universe pageant, was held on 15 July 1985 at the James L. Knight Convention Center in Miami, Florida, United States. Seventy-nine contestants competed in the pageant. Deborah Carthy-Deu of Puerto Rico was crowned by Yvonne Ryding of Sweden.

Results

Placements

Final Competition

Contestants

  - Yanina Castaño
  - Elizabeth Rowly
  - Martina Haiden
  - Cleopatra Adderly
  - Elizabeth Wadman
  - Anne van der Broeck
  - Jennifer Woods
  - Jannell Nadra Ford
  - Gabriela Orozco
  - Márcia Gabrielle
  - Jennifer Leonora Penn
  - Karen Elizabeth Tilley
  - Emily Hurston
  - Claudia Emilia  van Sint Jan del Pedregal
  - Sandra Eugenia Borda Caldas
  - Essie Apolonia Mokotupu
  - Rosibel Chacón Pereira
  - Sheida Weber
  - Andri Andreou
  - Susan Rasmussen
  - Margaret Rose Cools Lartigue
  - Melba Vicens Bello
  - María Elena Stangl
  - Julia Haydee Mora
  - Helen Westlake
  - Marja Kinnunen
  - Suzanne Iskandar
  - Batura Jallow
  - Stefanie Angelika Roth
  - Karina Hollands
  - Sabina Damianidis
  - Lucy Carbollido Montinola
  - Perla Elizabeth Prera Frunwirth
  - Arielle Jeanty
  - Brigitte Bergman
  - Diana Margarita García
  - Shallin Tse Ming 
  - Hana Bryndis Jonsdóttir
  - Sonu Walia
  - Olivia Marie Tracey
  - Hilla Kelmann
  - Anne Beatrice Popi
  - Hatsumi Furusawa
 - Choi Young-ok
  - Joyce Sahab
  - Gabrielle Chiarini
  - Agnes Chin
  - Fiona Micallef
  - Yolanda de la Cruz
  - Claire Glenister
  - Antoinette Marie Flores
  - Karen Margrethe Moe
  - Janette Iveth Vásquez Sanjur
  - Carmel Vagi
  - Beverly Ocampo
  - María Gracia Galleno
  - Joyce Burton
  - Katarzyna Zawidzka
  - Alexandra Gomes
  - Deborah Carthy-Deu
  - Dominique de Lort Serignan
  - Jacqueline Hendrie
  - Chantal Loubelo
  - Lyana Chiok
  - Teresa Sánchez López
  - Ramani Liz Bartholomeusz †
  - Carina Marklund
  - Hinarii Kilian
  - Tarntip Pongsuk
  - Brenda Joy Fahey
  - Miriam Coralita Adams
  - Andrea López
  - Laura Herring
  - Mudite Alda Henderson
  - Silvia Martínez
  - Barbara Christian
  - Tracy Mihaljevich
  - Dinka Delić
  - Kayonga Benita Mureka Tete

Notes

Debut

Withdrawals
 
  – participated in Miss France since this year
  – participated in Miss France since this year
  – participated in Miss France since this year
  – Alice Pfeiffer
  – Andrea Stelzer (see Miss South Africa controversy below), later competed as Miss Germany in 1989.

Awards
  - Miss Amity (Lucy Montinola)
  - Miss Photogenic (Brigitte Bergman)
  - Best National Costume (Sandra Caldas)

Host city
In October 1984, the owners of the newly expanded West Edmonton Mall in Edmonton, Alberta, Canada showed an interest in hosting the Miss Universe 1985 pageant there. This followed an unsuccessful attempt to host the Miss Universe 1984 pageant in Calgary, Alberta, Canada the previous year.

Pageant organizers chose to host the pageant in Miami, Florida for the second consecutive year. George Honchar, president of Miss Universe Inc., expressed disappointment at a lack of local support for the event, which cost the city $2 million.

Celebrity judges 
 Hardy Aimes
 Simon MacCorkindale - actor
 Rocío Jurado
 Victor Banerjee
 Lorraine Downes
 Susan George - actress
 Dong Kingman
 Olga Guillot
 Sheryl Lee Ralph
 Robin Moore
 June Taylor

Miss South Africa controversy
In April, 1985 the city of Miami requested that the Miss Universe organization insist that South Africa should not send a representative to pageant, due to the threat of demonstrations over her country's Apartheid policy. In mid May the nation announced that they would not send their titleholder, Andrea Steltzer, to the pageant because of fears for her safety. This was the first time since 1975 that the country did not participate in the pageant; they would not return to the event until 1995. Andrea Steltzer (half South African and half German) took part as Miss Germany in the 1989 Miss Universe pageant where she was a semi-finalist.

General references

References

External links
 Miss Universe official website

1985
1985 in the United States
1985 beauty pageants
Beauty pageants in the United States
1985 in Florida
Events in Miami
July 1985 events in the United States